Muddy Run may refer to:
Muddy Run (Christina River tributary), a stream in New Castle County, Delaware
Muddy Run (Georges Creek tributary), a stream in Fayette County, Pennsylvania
Muddy Run (Conodoguinet Creek tributary), in Franklin County, Pennsylvania
Muddy Run (Maurice River), a tributary of the Maurice River in New Jersey
Muddy Run (West Branch Susquehanna River), in Northumberland County, Pennsylvania
Muddy Run Pumped Storage Facility, a hydroelectric generation facility on the Susquehanna River in Pennsylvania
Muddy Run (Spruce Run), in Union County, Pennsylvania

See also
Muddy Creek (disambiguation)
Muddy River (disambiguation)
Muddy (disambiguation)